Thomasia angustifolia, commonly known as narrow-leaved thomasia, is a species of flowering plant in the family Malvaceae and is endemic to the south-west of Western Australia. It has densely hairy young stems, narrowly oblong, wrinkled leaves and pinkish-purple, bell-shaped flowers.

Description
The leaves are wavy and wrinkled with the edges rolled under, the lower side a paler shade of green and covered with star-shaped hairs.

Taxonomy and naming
Thomasia angustifolia was first formally described by botanist Ernst Gottlieb von Steudel in 1845 who published the description in Lehmann's Plantae Preissianae. The specific epithet (angustifolia) is from the Latin angustus meaning "narrow"  and folium meaning "leaf".

Distribution and habitat
Narrow-leaved thomasia is found growing in loam, sand plains and occasionally damp locations near creeks from Albany and west to Esperance.

References

angustifolia
Rosids of Western Australia
Plants described in 1845
Taxa named by Ernst Gottlieb von Steudel